Calacanthus is a genus of flowering plants belonging to the family Acanthaceae.

Its native range is India.

Species:

Calacanthus grandiflorus

References

Acanthaceae
Acanthaceae genera